Alamitophis is a genus of fossil snakes in the extinct family of Madtsoiidae. It is found in Australia (Tingamarra Fauna, after which A. tingamarra is named) and Argentina (Allen, La Colonia and Los Alamitos Formations, after which the genus is named).

References

External links 
 Australia's Lost Kingdoms

Cretaceous snakes
Eocene snakes
Maastrichtian genus first appearances
Ypresian extinctions
Cretaceous–Paleogene boundary
Paleogene reptiles of Australia
Fossils of Australia
Late Cretaceous reptiles of South America
Cretaceous Argentina
Fossils of Argentina
 
Allen Formation
Cañadón Asfalto Basin
Fossil taxa described in 1986